John Wygryme (died 5 October 1468) was a Canon of Windsor from 1457 to 1468.

Career

He was appointed:
Senior Proctor of Merton College, Oxford 1428
Rector of Devizes, Wiltshire
Prebendary of Decem Librarum, Lincoln 1457 - 1468

He was appointed to the eighth stall in St George's Chapel, Windsor Castle in 1457 and held the canonry until 1468.

Notes 

1468 deaths
Canons of Windsor
Year of birth unknown